Hohberg is a municipality in the district of Ortenau in Baden-Württemberg in Germany.

References

Ortenaukreis
Baden